Edis Tatli (born 13 August 1987) is a Finnish professional boxer. He has held the European lightweight title twice between 2015 and 2018, and has challenged once for the WBA lightweight title in 2014.

Early life
Tatli was born in Prizren, Yugoslavia, in present-day Kosovo, to a Turkish father and Albanian mother. He moved to Finland at the age of four and was raised in Hämeenlinna. Having first trained in karate as a youth, at age fourteen he started boxing and won his first Finnish Amateur Championship title in 2004.

Professional career

Tatli turned professional in 2007. In December 2012 he won the vacant EBU-EU lightweight title against Paolo Gassani and in March 2013 Tatli beat Felix Lora for the WBA Inter-Continental lightweight title. He successfully defended the title against Mzonke Fana in December 2013 and against Antonio De Vitis in May 2014.

In July 2014 it was announced that Tatli will challenge Richard Abril for the WBA lightweight world champion title on September 20 in Helsinki. Tatli is the second Finnish boxer fighting for the World Championship title. Olli Mäki lost a featherweight championship match to Davey Moore in August 1962 at the Helsinki Olympic Stadium. The fight between Abril and Tatli is promoted by Olli's son Pekka Mäki of P3 Boxing Oy. He lost the fight by majority decision

He was supposed to fight the EBU lightweight champion Emiliano Marsili on 25 April. Marsili got injured and vacated the belt. Tatli fought Yvan Mendy instead for the EBU lightweight title, and won the fight by unanimous decision.

Edis Tatli was scheduled to face two time lightweight challenger Kevin Mitchell on 18 March 2016 in Finland, but on 10 February, Mitchell announced his retirement and withdrawal from the fight. Tatli instead faced Massimiliano Ballisai and won the fight by unanimous decision.

On 13 August 2016, Tatli defended his European title against Christian Morales by unanimous decision.

On 6 May, 2017, Tatli was slated to defend his EBU lightweight belt against the highly rated Francesco Patera in his native Finland. The bout would start slow, with both boxers coming up to speed as the fight progressed. Patera was the busier man, but Tatli scored the powershots. The fight was ruled a split-decision win for Patera, with the judges scoring the fight 112-116, 113-115 and 116-112 for Patera.

In the immediate rematch, the fight was fast and entertaining from the beginning. Both fighters traded throughout the fight, with Tatli being the one whose shots visibly affected his opponent. Tatli was aggressive for most of the time, and even though he didn't manage to score a knockdown, all judges scored the fight 119-109 for the Finn, allowing him to retain the EBU lightweight title.

On 20 April, 2019, Tatli fought rising prospect Teofimo Lopez, who was ranked #4 by the WBA, WBC and IBF and #5 by the WBO at lightweight. As many expected, Lopez ended the fight inside the distance with a vicious body shot in the fifth round, from which Tatli could not get up.

Tatli returned to the ring against Berman Sánchez on 10 August 2019, winning the bout via unanimous decision.

He was scheduled to fight for the EBU lightweight title against Gianluca Ceglia in May 2020, but the bout was postponed to take place on 8 August 2020 due to the COVID-19 pandemic. In turn, the bout was postponed twice due to Tatli's shoulder surgery and the recovery and is now expected to take place on 14 August 2021.

Other appearances 
In Autumn 2018, Tatli won Dancing with the Stars, the Finnish version of the dance contest Strictly Come Dancing.

Professional boxing record

References

External links 

Edis Tatli - Profile, News Archive & Current Rankings at Box.Live

1987 births
Living people
Lightweight boxers
People from Prizren
European Boxing Union champions
Finnish male boxers
Kosovan emigrants to Finland
Yugoslav emigrants to Finland
Light-welterweight boxers
Finnish people of Albanian descent
Finnish people of Turkish descent